Trappist Monastery Provincial Park is a provincial park in the St. Norbert area of Winnipeg, Manitoba, Canada.

Designated a provincial park by the Government of Manitoba in 2002, it is considered to be a Class V protected area under the IUCN protected area management categories.

See also
List of protected areas of Manitoba

References

External links
Find Your Favorite Park: Trappist Monastery Provincial Park
Virtual Museum: A Day in the Life of a Trappist Monk

Provincial parks of Manitoba

St. Norbert, Winnipeg
Provincial Heritage Sites of Manitoba
Protected areas of Manitoba